Confederation Mall is a 329,128 sq. ft. shopping mall located at 22nd Street and Circle Drive in Saskatoon, Saskatchewan, Canada. The mall was originally named Confederation Park Plaza when it opened in mid-1973, at which time its anchor tenants were Canada Safeway and Woolco.

The mall was originally planned for a location on Saskatoon's east side, at the southwest corner of Clarence Avenue and Circle Drive (site of the present day Saskatoon Auto Mall), but in May 1972 Saskatoon City Council rejected the plan citing community concerns. As a result, the mall's developers looked to build on an alternate site on the city's west side. However plans for a mall in the area around what is now Confederation Park had existed at least as early as 1966.

An unusual aspect of the mall is that, around the time construction began on 18 November 1972, the Saskatoon Star-Phoenix, in conjunction with mall developers Trizec Equities Ltd., hosted a "You Name It" contest inviting readers to come up with a name for the mall. A Saskatoon resident won an Air Canada flight to London and $300 for choosing the name "Confederation Park Plaza".

In 1994, Woolco became Wal-Mart, and around this same time the mall underwent an expansion that added a food court and a new Safeway store; the original Safeway location became part of the food court with the remaining space used for a third anchor tenant, initially a branch of the Family Video home video rental chain, and later Petland. Other stores include clothing stores, electronics, services, florist, banks and jewelers.

In the summer of 2009, a new state of the art Walmart was constructed in a new power centre commercial area in the Blairmore Suburban Centre several kilometres west of Confederation Mall; the only Walmart in Saskatoon to house both a McDonald’s & a Tim Hortons,(closed in 2022) the one in the mall closed after the 2009 holiday season and in 2010 was renovated to house a Canadian Tire (with Mark's Work Wearhouse) that opened in Spring of 2011 (in turn, the new Canadian Tire replaced a standalone location that had operated in the nearby Plaza 22 shopping centre since the 1970s) and now houses three separate retailers and a fitness centre Fit 4 Less, Dollar Tree, Sport Chek, and a Jysk, The new Canadian Tire and Marks is a standalone, as its connection to the rest of the mall was closed. This resulted in a portion of the mall being reconfigured to house a new anchor, Winners, which is accessed from inside the mall. This was followed by the launch of a major interior renovation to the mall which, as of 2015, was to expand the food court which currently today houses a Tim Hortons & a TacoTime.

Anchors tenants
FreshCo since 2020
Petland since 2000
Canadian Tire since 2011
Winners since 2013
Anytime Fitness since 2019

Former anchor tenants

Safeway Inc. 1973-2019
Woolco 1973-1994
Wal-Mart 1994-2010 (relocated to Blairmore)
 Sport Mart 2004-2011

See also
 List of shopping malls in Saskatoon
 Confederation Suburban Centre, Saskatoon

References 

Buildings and structures in Saskatoon
Shopping malls in Saskatchewan
Shopping malls established in 1973